Muiredach Ua Cobthaig, also known in Latin as Mauricius, was a medieval Irish bishop.

He was "Bishop of Cenel-Eogain and of all the North of Ireland" in the Annals of Ulster. Cobthaig was present at the Synod of Kells during March 1152. He died on 10 February 1173. .

References

People from County Londonderry
12th-century Roman Catholic bishops in Ireland
Bishops of Cinél nEógain
1173 deaths